Mary Musoke is a Ugandan table tennis player. She competed at the 1992 Summer Olympics, the 1996 Summer Olympics, and the 2000 Summer Olympics.

References

External links
 

Year of birth missing (living people)
Living people
Ugandan female table tennis players
Olympic table tennis players of Uganda
Table tennis players at the 1992 Summer Olympics
Table tennis players at the 1996 Summer Olympics
Table tennis players at the 2000 Summer Olympics
Place of birth missing (living people)